Arkhangelsk State Technical University is a university founded in 1929. This university is composed of at least eight faculties and four institutes. The rector is Alexandr Nevzorov and the vice rector for foreign affairs is Galina Kamarova.

See also
 List of forestry universities and colleges

References

Arkhangelsk
Universities in Russia
Buildings and structures in Arkhangelsk
1929 establishments in Russia
Technical universities and colleges in Russia